A VeggieTales Movie may refer to:
Jonah: A VeggieTales Movie (2002)
The Pirates Who Don't Do Anything: A VeggieTales Movie (2008)